Sangkat Baray is a sangkat (quarter) in Doun Kaev Municipality, Takeo Province, Cambodia.

Administration 
As of 2019, Sangkat Baray has 14 phums (villages) as follows.

References 

Communes of Takéo province
Baray, Sangkat